Frederick Link Sale (May 2, 1902 – May 27, 1956) was a right-handed pitcher who appeared in one game in for the Pittsburgh Pirates in 1924.  He was a native of Chester, South Carolina.

He attended the University of Georgia where he was a member of the Sigma Chi fraternity.  He lettered in baseball as a pitcher from 1922 to 1924.  He pitched a one-hitter against Oglethorpe University in 1922.  In 1923 he tossed a perfect game against the University of Virginia.

On June 30, 1924, Sale came in to pitch the bottom of the 8th inning of a road game that the Pirates lost to the St. Louis Cardinals 7–5. Facing just four batters, he allowed two hits but no runs in his one inning of work. His lifetime ERA stands at 0.00.

Sale died at the age of 54 in Hermosa Beach, California.

References

External links
Baseball Reference
Retrosheet

Major League Baseball pitchers
Baseball players from South Carolina
Pittsburgh Pirates players
University of Georgia alumni
Georgia Bulldogs baseball players
1902 births
1956 deaths